The China–Korea Treaty of 1882 was unequal treaty between the Qing dynasty and the Joseon dynasty in October 1882.  This agreement has been described as the Joseon-Qing Communication and Commerce Rules; and it has been called the Sino-Korean Regulations for Maritime and Overland Trade. The treaty stipulated that Joseon is a tributary state of Qing, thereby the subjugative influence over Joseon by the Qing Dynasty was started. After 1894, Qing lost its influence over Joseon because of the First Sino-Japanese War.

In October, the two countries signed a treaty stipulating that Korea was dependent on China and granted Chinese merchants the right to conduct overland and maritime business freely within its borders. It also gave the Chinese advantages over the Japanese and Westerners and granted them unilateral extraterritoriality privileges in civil and criminal cases. Under the treaty, the number of Chinese merchants and traders significantly increased, a severe blow to Korean merchants. Although it allowed Koreans reciprocally to trade in Beijing, the agreement was not a treaty but was in effect issued as a regulation for a tributary. Additionally, during the following year, the Chinese supervised the creation of a Korean Maritime Customs Service, headed by von Möllendorff. Korea was became to a semi-colonial tributary state of China with King Gojong unable to appoint diplomats without Chinese approval, and with troops stationed in the country to protect Chinese interests.

Background
In 1876, Korea established a trade treaty with Japan after Japanese ships approached Ganghwado. Treaty negotiations with several Western countries were made possible by the completion of this initial Japanese overture.

In 1882, the Americans concluded a treaty and established diplomatic relations, which served as a template for subsequent negotiations with other Western powers.

Two weeks after the United States–Korea Treaty of 1882, a military revolt called Imo Incident occurred in Seoul. The soldiers occupied Changdeok Palace, and the Korean government asked for military help from China. The revolt was suppressed by Chinese troops. After the incident, Chinese political influence over Korea started.

Treaty provisions
The Chinese and Koreans negotiated and approved a multi-article treaty with provisions affecting Korean diplomatic relations with Western nations.

The Joseon-Qing Communication and Commerce Rules sought to mitigate the effects of increased diplomatic intercourse and expanded commercial relations with Western powers.  The negotiated agreement caused unintended consequences.

See also
Unequal treaties
China-Korea Treaty of 1899

References

Notes

Citations

Bibliography

 Chu, Samuel C. (1994). Li Hung-chang and China's Early Modernization. Armonk, New York: Sharpe.  (hc);  (pb); 
 Kim, Chun-gil. (2005). The History of Korea. Westport, Connecticut: Greenwood Press.  (hc);  (pb); 
 
 
 
 
 Korean Mission to the Conference on the Limitation of Armament, Washington, D.C., 1921–1922. (1922). Korea's Appeal to the Conference on Limitation of Armament. Washington: U.S. Government Printing Office. 
 Yŏng-ho Ch'oe; William Theodore De Bary; Martina Deuchler and Peter Hacksoo Lee. (2000). Sources of Korean Tradition: Volume Two: From the Sixteenth to the Twentieth Centuries. New York: Columbia University Press.  (hc);  (pb); 

Unequal treaties
Treaties of the Qing dynasty
Treaties of the Joseon dynasty
1882 in Korea
1882 in China
China–Korea relations
October 1882 events